The 2017–18 Southern Utah Thunderbirds basketball team represented Southern Utah University during the 2017–18 NCAA Division I men's basketball season. The Thunderbirds were led by second-year head coach Todd Simon and played their home games at the America First Events Center in Cedar City, Utah as members of the Big Sky Conference. They finished the season 13–19, 5–13 in Big Sky play to finish in tenth place. In the Big Sky tournament they defeated Idaho State and Idaho to advance to the semifinals where they lost to Eastern Washington.

Previous season
The Thunderbirds finished the 2016–17 season 6–27, 3–15 in Big Sky play to finish in a tie for 11th. As the No. 11 seed in the Big Sky tournament, they defeated Montana State in the first round before losing to Weber State in the quarterfinals.

Offseason

Departures

Incoming transfers

2017 recruiting class

Roster

Schedule and results

|-
! colspan="9" style=| Exhibition

|-
! colspan="9" style=|Non-conference regular season

|-
! colspan="9" style=| Big Sky regular season

|-
! colspan="9" style=| Big Sky tournament

References

2017-18 team
2017–18 Big Sky Conference men's basketball season
2018 in sports in Utah
2017 in sports in Utah